Cottonwood Lake is a lake in South Dakota, in the United States.

The lake was so named on account of the cottonwood trees which grew there.

In the first half of the 20th century rodeos have been held near Cottonwood Lake.

See also
List of lakes in South Dakota

References

Lakes of South Dakota
Bodies of water of Spink County, South Dakota